The  Pakistan Meteorological Department (PMD) (also known as Pakistan Met Office), is an autonomous and independent institution tasked with providing weather forecasts and public warnings concerning weather for protection, safety and general information.

Apart from meteorology, it is also involved in monitoring as well as investigating weather phenomenons, astronomical events, hydrology and research in astrophysics, climate changes and studies on aeronautical engineering, renewable energy resources across various parts of the country. Headquartered in Islamabad.

Till 1991, PMD was providing Aviation Weather services to Defense Forces through regular deputation of meteorologists to PAF. However, in 1991, PAF formed its own Met branch and officers are now inducted on regular basis to meet Aviation requirements. The main training however is being imparted by PMD through formal recognized courses. PAF Met branch is now providing weather services to PAF, Army, Navy, and paramilitary forces.

PMD has offices and research facilities in all provinces and territories of the country.

History
Shortly after independence in 1947, the Pakistan Meteorological Department was established and inherited 15 meteorological observatories from the Central Meteorological Organization of the British Raj. In 1948, PMD began providing basic weather forecast to Pakistan's print media. In the 1950s, the meteorological department became one of the leading scientific institutions in Pakistan; concerning itself in the field of research in space and atmospheric sciences, it worked in close coordination with the Ministry of Defence (MoD) and the Ministry of Environment (MoEn) for reporting accurate weather information for aviation and hydrography. In the 1960s, the meteorological department was split and the Pakistan Navy Hydrographic Department was established for the Pakistan Navy. Some of Pakistan's most notable and reputable scientists have been affiliated with the PMD. It assisted the federal government in establishing the Space Research Commission (SRC) in 1961, where many of its atmospheric scientists and technical staff joined the new space agency. The PMD has also assisted and lead studies in the Geomagnetic Field Monitoring Program of the SRC. Since its establishment, the PMD has become one of the leading governmental scientific institution in guiding the government in environmental and space policy formation. In 1965, the first televised weather forecast was broadcast by PTV. Since 1974, the meteorological department has been collecting data on seismic activity in Pakistan and thus is able to act as a consultant in seismic design of dams, buildings as well as disaster relief schemes. PMD's flood forecasting system has assisted the other government as well.

Directorates
The Pakistan Meteorological Department is headed by the Director General. The Department is further divided into several directorates as follows:

 Institute of Meteorology & Geophysics, Karachi (IMG)
 Tropical Cyclone Warning Center, Karachi (TCWC)
 National Seismic Monitoring & Tsunami Early Warning Center, Islamabad (NSMC)
 National Seismic Monitoring Center (Backup Station), Karachi (NSMC)
 Directorate of Maintenance, Karachi
 Workshop, Karachi
 National Meteorological Communication Centre, Karachi (NMCC) 
 Directorate of Forecasting and Climatology, Karachi (F&C)
 Climate Data Processing Center, Karachi (CDPC)
 Regional Meteorological Centers of each Province :-
Karachi Regional Meteorological Center (RMC-Karachi)
Lahore Regional Meteorological Center (RMC-Lahore)
Peshawar Regional Meteorological Center (RMC-Peshawar)
Quetta Regional Meteorological Center (RMC-Quetta)
Gilgit Regional Meteorological Center (RMC-GB)
 Remote Sensing, Islamabad
 National Agromet Center, Islamabad (NAMC)
 Lai Nullah Flood Early Warning Center, Islamabad
 Drought, Environmental Monitoring & Early Warning Center, Islamabad
 Flood Forecasting Division, Lahore (FFD)
 Geophysical Centre, Quetta
 Research & Development, Islamabad (R&D)
 National Weather Forecasting Centre, Islamabad (NWFC)
 Main Analysis Centre, Karachi (MAC)
 Aviation Meteorological Offices (MO) :-
Jinnah International Airport, Karachi
Faisalabad International Airport
Islamabad International Airport
Allama Iqbal International Airport, Lahore
Bacha Khan International Airport, Peshawar
Quetta International Airport
 Chief Administrative Office (CAO)

Observatories
The Pakistan Meteorological Department established and expanded its network of meteorological observatories across Pakistan since 1947. As of 2017, there are 111 meteorological, airborne and astronomical observatories:

 47 observatories in Punjab & Islamabad Capital Territory.
 13 observatories in Gilgit Baltistan and Azad Jammu & Kashmir
 17 observatories in Khyber Pakhtunkhwa
 18 observatories in Sindh
 16 observatories in Balochistan

Weather stations

Some weather stations have limited reporting times, while other report continuously, mainly Pakistan Air Force and Army Aviation Corps stations where a manned met office is provided for military operations. Reports (observations) from weather stations vary considerably and it is because there are different types of weather in different regions. There is list of weather stations below:

Karachi, Sindh —  The meteorological office at Jinnah International Airport works in close coordination with the Civil Aviation Authority (CAA). Additional weather stations are situated at PAF Base Masroor.
Lahore, Punjab —  The meteorological office is located at Allama Iqbal International Airport while several airborne observatories are located in Shahi Qilla, Misri Shah, Upper Mall and Shahdara.
Islamabad, Capital Territory — A weather station, meteorological office and several observatories are located at Zero Point, Saidpur, Margalla Hills and Golra Sharif in the west.
Rawalpindi, Punjab — A weather station is situated at Benazir Bhutto International Airport while the meteorological office and observatory are located at Dhamial Army Airbase. A complete manned weather station is also situated at Shamasabad in North Rawalpindi and in Bokra.

Weather surveillance radars 
Weather surveillance radars are planned to be built at Multan and Sukkur, which reluctantly provides the coverage of the entire country. These radars are already in operation in Islamabad and Karachi. These radars will be equipped with the state-of-the-art technologies.

See also 

 World Meteorological Organization
 Geological Survey of Pakistan
 List of extreme weather records in Pakistan
 National Institute of Oceanography (Pakistan)
 Space and Upper Atmosphere Research Commission

References

External links
 PMD official website
 Training at PMD
 Contact List of PMD Management 
 Pakistan Journal of Meteorology

Governmental meteorological agencies in Asia
1947 establishments in Pakistan
Climate of Pakistan
Pakistan federal departments and agencies
Science and technology in Pakistan
Geography of Pakistan
Government agencies established in 1947